Woolgathering is a book by Patti Smith, published by Hanuman Books in 1992. In 2012 she published a 20th anniversary edition with additional material. The book was reissued again in 2021.

The original publication was part of a series of small (approximately 3 inch by 4 inch) books published by Hanuman Books from New York's Hotel Chelsea. The slim book consists of eleven semi-autobiographical prose poems, and was written while Smith was living in Michigan, largely out of the public eye. The poems are interspersed with black-and-white photographs.

Contents 
 "A Bidding"
 "The Woolgatherers"
 "Barndance"
 "Cowboy Truths"
 "Indian Rubies"
 "Drawing"
 "Art in Heaven"
 "Flying"
 "A Farewell"

References

External links 
 

Poetry by Patti Smith
1992 books
Books by Patti Smith